Over the course of their five-year career, British indie rock band Envy & Other Sins recorded 15 songs for one studio album and three singles.

Released songs
All songs credited to Envy & Other Sins.

Unreleased material

References

 
Envy and Other Sins